Adegan (also Romanized as ‘Ādegān and Adgān; also known as Adgūn and Adkān) is a village in Zayandeh Rud-e Shomali Rural District, in the Central District of Faridan County, Isfahan Province, Iran. At the 2006 census, its population was 698, in 167 families.

References 

Populated places in Faridan County